Michael Stürzenberger (born 28 September 1964) is a German far-right politician, activist and blogger. He was the leader of the German Freedom Party from 2013 to 2016, and has been active in anti-Islam protests with groups such as Pegida. He has been observed by the Bavarian Office for the Protection of the Constitution since 2013.

Biography
Stürzenberger studied political science and history at the Ludwig Maximilian University of Munich from 1984 to 1988, but did not complete his studies and subsequently worked as a journalist.

Before he joined the German Freedom Party he had been the press spokesman for the Christian Social Union in Bavaria (CSU). He has cited the death of his party colleague Ralph Burkei in the 2008 Mumbai attacks as a formative event for his anti-Islam beliefs. He was elected to the federal executive board of the German Freedom Party in 2011, but due to his radical Islamophobic attitude, his election led to the resignation of several state executives and many members. He had previously been relieved of his positions in the party after a blog post that called for Muslims to be forced to leave the country unless they renounced their faith. He was elected leader of the party after René Stadtkewitz resigned in 2013, and held the position until 2016 when the party was dissolved in favour of the Alternative for Germany (AfD). 

Stürzenberger has also been active as the leader of the German branch of Stop Islamisation of Europe, and as a Pegida activist, and was in 2015 described as "the face of the Munich branch of Pegida". He had already for many years held anti-Islam protests in the Munich city square. In his rallies he railed against the presence of Islam in Germany, and in particular the plans of Imam Benjamin Idriz to build an Islamic centre in Munich. He has also been an active contributor to the counter-jihad blog Politically Incorrect. He has been convicted by a Munich court and fined 2,500 euros for "insulting" and "belittling" Muslims and Islam on the Politically Incorrect blog.

In August 2017 he was sentenced to a half year in prison for sharing a photo on Facebook of a ranking Nazi shaking hands with the Grand Mufti of Jerusalem Amin al-Husseini. He was later acquitted for the charges.

In December 2017 he was sentenced by a Duisburg court to a fine of 2,400 euros at 120 daily rates for incitement to hatred. At a Pegida event in 2015, he spoke of an "invasion" from the Islamic world, among other things. At the time of the crime, Stürzenberger already had three previous convictions. In the court of appeal, this procedure was discontinued at the request of the public prosecutor's office.

References

Living people
1964 births
Counter-jihad activists
Leaders of political parties in Germany
German bloggers
German critics of Islam
People convicted of racial hatred offences